Tommy Ramdhan (born 28 November 1996) is a British track and field athlete who competes in 100m, 200m, and 4x100m relay races.

Early life
Ramdhan was born in Greenwich, southeast London, and attended Hurstmere School in Sidcup, Kent. Ramdhan was a rugby union player on the books at the academy of Saracens RFC before concentrating on athletics. He completed a BTEC Extended Diploma in Sport Coaching & Fitness at Oaklands College in Hertfordshire, and also attended Loughborough College.

Career
Ramdhan won gold in the 200m at the 2015 European Athletics Junior Championships, winning in a wind assisted time of 20.57 seconds ahead of compatriot Elliott Powell in Eskilstuna, Sweden.

In June 2019 Ramdhan competed at the Oslo Diamond League event finishing seventh behind then world leader Christian Coleman. In September 2020, Ramdhan won bronze at the British national championships 100m race, running 10.44 seconds in Manchester. 

Ramdhan was part of the British team  2022 European Athletics Championships. He ran 4th leg of the 4 x 100 metres relay that won their semi-final to qualify for the final where the team went on to win gold in the final.

References

External links

 1996 births
Living people
British male sprinters
English male sprinters
European Athletics Championships winners